Drasteria herzi is a moth of the family Erebidae first described by Sergei Alphéraky in 1895. It is found in Transcaucasia, Turkmenistan, Khirgizia, Turkey, northern Iran, Israel, Jordan and Sanai.

There are two generations per year. Adults are on wing in from February to April and October to December.

Subspecies
Drasteria herzi herzi
Drasteria herzi judaica (Hampson, 1926) (Israel)

References

External links

Image

Drasteria
Moths of Asia
Moths described in 1895